Daneri is a surname. Notable people with the surname include:

Alicia Daneri (born 1942), Argentine Egyptologist
Antonio Daneri (1884–?), Argentine sport shooter